Lucy Beall Candler Owens Heinz Leide (April 11, 1883 – September 3, 1962) was an American heiress. She was the only daughter of Asa Griggs Candler, the co-founder of The Coca-Cola Company.

Biography

Early life
She was born on April 11, 1883, in Atlanta, Georgia. Growing up, she learned to play the piano. She lived with her parents at Callan Castle at 61 Elizabeth Street in the Atlanta, Georgia, neighborhood Inman Park. She attended school at West End Institute. She played the organ for Inman Park Methodist Church. She attended Agnes Scott College in neighboring Decatur, Georgia.

Marriages
On June 11, 1903, she married her first husband, William Davies Owens. He became an assistant cashier (a manager) at Central Bank and Trust in Atlanta, the bank that Asa Candler started in 1905. At first, they lived together in her parents’ home. In 1910 they moved to a newly built home in nearby Druid Hills which became known as The Goose. It was located at what is now 1449 South Ponce de Leon Avenue. In 1968, the home became the Mother Goose day care center and, later, classroom space for The Paideia School until it burned down in 2009. William Owens died of influenza and a heart attack in the house in 1914. Lucy suffered from a serious bout of typhoid fever.

Around 1920, she married Henry Heinz, a banker and president of Kiwanis International. Heinz was shot by a burglar at their home, Rainbow Terrace, in 1943. A black railroad worker confessed to the crime, but rumours persisted that a relative murdered Heinz.

Around 1945, she married Enrico Leide, a concert cellist and orchestra conductor who conducted the first Atlanta Symphony Orchestra from 1920 to 1930. He was the brother of the violinist and composer Manoah Leide-Tedesco.

Death
She died on September 3, 1962, aboard the RMS Caronia while on a cruise of the Mediterranean Sea.

References

1880s births
1962 deaths
Coca-Cola people
People from Atlanta
Druid Hills, Georgia
Candler family
People who died at sea